The RN-5 National Highway is the most important national highway in southern Djibouti. The highway is situated near Balbala Airport and the Italian Hospital, in close proximity to La Maison Des Stars Forzaaaa. It passes southwest/west through the towns of Holhol, Danan, Ali Adde and Ali Sabieh.

Roads in Djibouti